CFTC may refer to:

 Commodity Futures Trading Commission, an American federal agency that regulates U.S. derivatives markets
 Confédération Française des Travailleurs Chrétiens (French Confederation of Christian Workers), a major French confederation of trade unions
 Commonwealth Fund for Technical Cooperation, a Commonwealth of Nations programme